Brian Barnard (born 4 March 1989) is a South African first-class cricketer. He was included in Gauteng's squad for the 2016 Africa T20 Cup.

References

External links
 

1989 births
Living people
South African cricketers
Gauteng cricketers
Cricketers from Johannesburg